The iPod Nano (stylised and marketed as iPod nano) is a discontinued portable media player designed and formerly marketed by Apple Inc. The first generation model was introduced on September 7, 2005, as a replacement for the iPod Mini, using flash memory for storage. The iPod Nano went through several differing models, or generations, after its introduction. Apple discontinued the iPod Nano on July 27, 2017.

Development
Development work on the design of the iPod Nano started only nine months before its launch date. The Nano was launched in two colors (black and white) with two available sizes: 2 GB (roughly 500 songs) and 4 GB (1000 songs). On February 7, 2006, Apple updated the lineup with the 1 GB model (240 songs). Apple also released some accessories, including armbands and silicone "tubes" designed to bring color to the Nano and protect it from scratches, as well as a combination lanyard-earphone accessory that hangs around the neck and avoids the problem of tangled earphone cords. The latest models with Bluetooth headphones have a similar advantage.

History

1st generation

On September 7, 2005, Apple introduced the iPod Nano at a media event with Steve Jobs pointing to the small watch pocket in his jeans and asking, "Ever wonder what this pocket is for?" The stated battery life is up to 14 hours, while the screen is 176×132 pixels,  diagonal, displaying 65,536 colors (16-bit color). The device has a 1, 2, or 4 GB capacity. On November 11, 2011, Apple announced a recall on this model of iPod nano due to a battery overheat issue.

2nd generation

On September 25, 2006, Apple updated the Nano line. The second-generation Nano features scratch-resistant, anodized aluminum casing like the earlier Mini's design; the multiple color choices mirror those of the Mini as well. However, unlike the second-generation Mini, the button labels are grey instead of matching the Nano's casing (except for the black Nano, which has a black click wheel). The second-generation Nano featured a 40% brighter, "more vibrant" display, a battery life upgrade (from 14 to 24 hours), and storage sizes doubled to 2, 4, and 8 GB models. The second generation also introduced gapless playback of audio files, along with a new search option.

The 2 GB model was available in silver only. The 4 GB was originally available in green, blue, silver, or pink, and the 8 GB model was initially only available in black - red was later added for 4 and 8 GB models. Apple said that the second generation iPod Nano's packaging is "32% lighter with 52% less volume than the first generation", thereby reducing environmental impact and shipping costs.

On October 13, 2006, Apple announced a special edition iPod Nano; Product Red, with a red exterior and 4 GB of storage. For each red iPod Nano sold in the United States, Apple donates US$10 to the Product Red initiative, while retaining the regular price. On November 3, 2006, Apple introduced a red 8 GB model, due to "outstanding customer demand", again retaining the same price point of the equivalent black model.

3rd generation

Apple updated the design for the Nano again on September 5, 2007. The third-generation Nano featured a  QVGA (320 x 240) screen and a shorter, wider, heavier design, with new colors. New features include browsing via Cover Flow, a new user interface, video playback, and support for new iPod Games. Users have to repurchase games bought a month before the debut of the new iPod as they were not supported. The Nano was announced in a 4 GB version in silver and an 8 GB version in silver, turquoise, mint green, black, and Product Red. The battery lasts for approximately 24 hours on audio playback and approximately 5 hours on video playback. On January 22, 2008, Apple released a pink version of the 8 GB iPod Nano.

Combining elements from previous generations of the iPod Nano, the third-generation Nano has an aluminum front plate and a stainless steel back plate. The Nano also sports a new minimalistic hold switch, similar to the iPod Shuffle's power switch, which has been moved to the bottom of the player. The  screen had the highest pixel density of any Apple product at the time, having the same pixel count as the  display of the iPod Classic.

On October 6, 2007, Apple released a firmware update (1.0.2) via iTunes that they said would improve Cover Flow and yield faster menu navigation. The update was also released for the iPod Classic. On November 28, 2007, Apple released another firmware update (1.0.3) via iTunes, which includes unspecified bugfixes. January 15, 2008 saw the release of version 1.1, which adds support for iTunes movie rentals, music song lyrics support and includes more unspecified bugfixes. Apple released update version 1.1.2 in May 2008 and version 1.1.3 in July 2008 with even more bug fixes.

4th generation

At the Apple Let's Rock Event on September 9, 2008, the iPod Nano Fourth Generation was officially announced. It returns to the narrow form factor of the 1st and 2nd Generation model, while retaining and rotating the  screen from the 3rd gen model. It has a curved aluminum shell and glass screen (the glass screen being held in place with nothing but the shell). Apple said the battery lasts 24 hours of music playback, and 4 hours of video playback, compared to the 5 hours of the previous generation.

The six previous colors (silver, black, mint, turquoise, berry red, and rose pink) were replaced by silver, black, purple, light blue, green, yellow, orange, red and pink, for a total of nine, although the Product Red color was only available directly from Apple (website and retail stores). Apple marketed the new colors as "Nano-chromatic". Also added is an accelerometer which allows the Nano to shuffle songs by shaking it, the option between portrait and landscape display modes by tilting the iPod left or right, and access to Cover Flow when tilted sideways. Videos, however, can only be played in landscape mode. The user interface was also refreshed, adding a more stylized look in keeping with the new hardware design. It includes a new voice recording feature which starts automatically when an Apple compatible microphone is plugged in. It also includes the new "Genius" feature, introduced by Apple the same day. The Genius feature automatically creates playlists based on a selected song using an algorithm built by Apple.

It was additionally touted as "the most environmentally friendly iPod Apple has ever made", containing arsenic-free glass and a BFR-, mercury-, and PVC-free design. Apple also said it is highly recyclable. The iPod Nano fourth-generation was shipped in cases similar to the second-generation ones with the clear view in the front, and is marketed in three models: 4 GB (limited production to Europe only) and 8 GB and 16 GB. Limited quantities of an unannounced 4 GB model surfaced in various markets. Also, the iPod Quiz game was dropped and replaced with a Maze game which makes use of the iPod's accelerometer similarly to such games on the iPhone and iPod Touch.

The fourth generation dropped support for charging via FireWire. "This change means that any dock accessories that use the dock connector's FireWire pins to send power—many older speakers and car chargers, for example—will not charge the fourth-generation iPod Nano."

5th generation

As well as continuing to support picture viewing and video playback, it also includes Live Pause, a built-in pedometer, Nike+iPod Support and a speaker. This model also has the Genius Mix feature installed.

The headphone jack and dock connector swap locations so that the headphone jack is to the left of the dock connector. Therefore, the fifth generation iPod Nano uses a different Apple Universal Dock insert than the fourth generation.

The fifth generation iPod Nano has nine finishes: Silver, Black, Purple, Blue, Yellow, Orange, Product Red, Green, and Pink. All have a glossier, shinier finish than the fourth generation. Just like the fourth-generation iPod Nano, Product Red Nano was only available on the Apple Online Store and Apple Retail Store.

This generation was discontinued on September 1, 2010.

6th generation

At a media event on September 1, 2010, Apple announced the sixth generation iPod Nano, which, among many new features, is designed around a high-resolution square touch-screen.

The device features a small 1.55-inch multi-touch screen with a lower resolution of 240×240 pixels but a higher pixel density of 220 pixels per inch, as opposed to the larger 2.2-inch screen on the fifth-generation iPod Nano. The device has a 0.39 watt-hour battery rated at 3.7 volts, giving a capacity of 105 mAh, and specified to give 24 hours of music playback on a single full charge. The device takes about three hours for one full charge. The device retains the same 30-pin dock connector as previous generations. This Nano loses the previous generation's video camera, built-in voice recorder microphone (although plugging in headphones with a built in microphone reveals a Voice Memos app) and built-in speaker, and games. It also loses support for video playback, but music videos and video podcasts (vodcasts) can be synced onto the device, and the audio from them plays on the device, with a single key-frame shown on the screen. It still includes the Nike+iPod fitness option as well as an FM radio tuner with RDS (Radio Data System). It has a black-on-white screen contrast option and other accessibility options. The 6th generation iPod Nano has the same price point as the 5th generation device.

A firmware update (version 1.1) for the Nano was released on February 28, 2011. The update adds the ability to change songs or pause with a double click of the sleep/wake button. It also adds the ability to turn the device off by holding the sleep/wake button. The user interface is also enhanced. On October 4, 2011, the iPod Nano 1.2 update was unveiled at the Apple "Let's Talk iPhone" event at the Town Hall, 4 Infinite Loop. This update adds the option to increase or decrease the size of the home buttons for easier use. The update also adds a better fitness app, which has a better pedometer split into walking and running style. The update also includes 16 new clock faces, which includes designs like a Nixie tube clock face or an old-style clock face, and Disney-licensed designs, such as Mickey Mouse and Kermit the Frog, bringing to a total of 18 clock faces. Three more background images were also added.

Some accessory makers produced watch bands for the 6th generation Nano, allowing it to be worn like a watch. In September 2013, TUAW compared the iPod Nano to the Samsung Galaxy Gear, and considered the three-year-old model to be a "better, cheaper smartwatch" than the Galaxy Gear because of its more complete functionality in comparison, and its inclusion of a headphone jack.

7th generation

 Apple announced the seventh and final generation iPod Nano on September 12, 2012. The (maximum) internal storage capacity has not been increased compared with the previous model but a single, 16 GB version of the seventh generation iPod Nano was announced at the product launch. Apple described it as their "thinnest iPod ever." It is 38% thinner (5.4 mm) than the Nano it replaces (8.78 mm), and adds the ability to use Bluetooth 4.0 wireless headsets, speakers and other devices (such as heart-rate monitors). It still includes the Nike+iPod fitness option as well as an FM radio tuner which works when connected to headphones or a stereo jack. On 15 July 2015, Apple refreshed the iPod Nano, offering 5 more subdued colors (gold, silver, blue, pink and space grey) compared to the original 7 jewel tones, in addition to the (Product) Red model. On July 27, 2017, Apple discontinued the iPod Nano, along with the iPod shuffle, making the iPod touch the last model of the iPod line.

The 7th generation featured a 2.5 inch, touch-sensitive 432x240 display at 202 PPI, Bluetooth 4.0 (with support for NIKE+ iPod wireless systems), and a Lightning connector to replace the original 30-pin dock connector. Although its software resembles the iOS user interface, it is not an iOS device. The current and final version of the iPod software for this device is 1.0.4 for the initial release model and 1.1.2 for the mid 2015 refresh model. This is the last and final iPod Nano to date sold.

Specifications

Supported audio formats
Lossy:
AAC (8 to 320 kbit/s)
Protected AAC (from the iTunes Store)
MP3 (8 to 320 Kib/s, including variable bitrate files)
Audible (formats 2, 3 and 4)

Lossless/original PCM:
Apple Lossless
AIFF
WAV

Other container:
MP4

Reception

The initial consumer response to the iPod Nano was overwhelmingly positive and sales were heavy. The Nano sold its first million units in 17 days, helping Apple Inc. to a record billion-dollar profit in 2005.

Apple's release of the iPod Nano as a replacement for the iPod Mini was viewed by many as a risky move. Steve Jobs argued that the iPod Nano was a necessary risk since competitors were beginning to catch up to the iPod Mini in terms of design and features, and believed the iPod Nano would prove to be even more popular and successful than the iPod Mini.

Durability and repairability
Within days of the Nano's release, some users reported damage to the Nano, suggesting that the LCD screen had become so scratched that it was unreadable, even when the backlight was on. Many reported fine scratches on Nanos, caused by microfiber cloths. Other owners reported that their Nano's screen cracked without use of excessive force.

On September 27, 2005, Apple confirmed that a small percentage ("less than 1/10 of 1 percent") of iPod Nanos shipped with a faulty screen and agreed to replace any that had cracked screens, but denied the iPod Nano was more susceptible to scratching than prior iPods. Apple started shipping iPod Nanos with a protective sleeve to protect them from scratches. In October 2005 a class action lawsuit was filed against Apple, with the plaintiffs seeking reimbursement for the device, legal fees, and "unlawful or illegal profits" from sales of the iPod Nano. Lawyers for the plaintiffs claimed that the devices "scratch excessively during normal usage, rendering the screen on the Nanos unreadable, and violating state consumer protection statutes". Similar lawsuits were later filed in Mexico and the United Kingdom.

In early 2009, Apple was in the process of settling a court case over the scratched iPod Nano screens. It was suggested that Apple should set aside $22 million to refund users. At the time, it required a Judge's sign-off on the terms by April 28, 2009. Some commentators such as BusinessWeek'''s Arik Hesseldahl have criticized the lawsuits. Hesseldahl dismissed them as "stupid" and suggested that they benefitted "no one but the trial lawyers," but also suggested that Apple could have avoided litigation by offering "full refunds on unwanted Nanos" instead of charging a re-stocking fee and lengthening the return period from 14 days (when purchased through Apple retail or online) to 30 or 60 days.

Incidents
In Australia, an iPod Nano caught fire while being charged on a PC.

In another incident, a man's iPod Nano set his pants on fire while he was working at Hartsfield-Jackson Atlanta International Airport.

In addition, an iPod Nano sparked in Japan in January 2008 while it was recharging. Although no one was injured during the incident, Apple Inc. investigated the incident. It was reported on August 19, 2008 that 17 incidents of abnormal overheating with first generation iPod Nano units while recharging had been reported in Japan, including cases in which tatami'' mats had been charred. On August 10, 2010, Apple Japan released a statement saying that it would replace any iPod Nanos that overheated.

Since 2010, users have been reporting the 6th generation iPod Nano's sleep/wake button remains stuck after months of use, making it impossible to activate the device without the help of a computer or a dock accessory. According to a technical inspection, the device uses double-sided tape to hold the button in place, indicating a possible design fault.

On November 11, 2011, Apple announced the iPod Nano (1st generation) Replacement Program, intended to address concerns over overheating batteries. Customers with affected devices can fill out a claim form to confirm eliGBility for replacement. Defective devices will be replaced within six weeks and will carry 90-day warranties. Customers who have personalized iPod Nano devices will not be able to receive personalization on their replacement devices. During the replacement process, there have been several reports of users receiving an iPod Nano 6th generation as replacement instead of the expected 1st generation device that users sent in during the recall. Because using the iPod nano 6th generation with a Mac computer requires iTunes 10 or higher, which in turn requires Mac OS X Leopard system software, Apple will upgrade the system software of participants running earlier versions of macOS, on request but this leaves users that do not have access to iTunes without a working device (because Apple changed the hashing of the music database which prevented the 6th generation iPod Nano from being used with open source software via libgpod).

References

External links

Nano
ITunes
Portable media players
Product safety scandals
Touchscreen portable media players
Computer-related introductions in 2005
Products introduced in 2005
Products and services discontinued in 2017
Digital audio players
Discontinued Apple Inc. products